Front of Hope 2021 is a reformist Peruvian political party. Founded in 2020 by former congressman and government minister Fernando Olivera, the party is organized as the direct successor of the defunct Hope Front party, which lost its registration at the National Elections Jury as it failed to pass the electoral threshold in the 2016 general election.

History 
Upon the results of the 2016 general election on 10 April 2016, presidential nominee Fernando Olivera announced he would found a successor party to the Hope Front in order to run again for President of Peru at the 2021 general election.

On 29 September 2020, a day before the deadline for parties to fully register in the National Elections Jury in order to participate in the upcoming general election, Olivera filed registration for his new party, and announced his candidacy for the presidential nomination. He was ratified as the presidential nominee on 6 December 2020, with the unanimous vote of 41 regional delegates. However on 24 December 2020, the party was declared that did not fulfill requirements for registration in order to participate in the elections and consequently, the presidential and congressional tickets are rejected.

Ideology and positions 
Front of Hope 2021 ideology stands on a strong anticorruption rhetoric propelled by its leader, Fernando Olivera. Among its positions, the party advocates for a total reform and restructuring of the Peruvian State, alleging corruption as the main "disease" that has perverted the history of Peru since the early days of the republic. The year 2021 is highlighted as part of the celebrations of Peru's bicentennial on 28 July 2021.

Its symbol has the same broom used as the official logo of the defunct Independent Moralizing Front, the first party founded by Olivera in 1990, and disbanded in 2006 following the loss of party registration, with the addition of a green case.

Election results

Presidential election

Elections to the Congress of the Republic

See also
 Independent Moralizing Front
 Hope Front (Peru)

References

Political parties established in 2020